Adam Masuhr, born Andersson (born May 21, 1983) is a Swedish former professional ice hockey defenceman, he last played as Captain for Mora IK of the HockeyAllsvenskan (Allsv).

Playing career 
After playing for his hometown team Gävle GIK as a youngster, he joined Mora IK's youth ranks and made his debut on the club's men's squad in the second-tier league HockeyAllsvenskan during the 2000-01 season. Masuhr signed with Brynäs IF of the Swedish Hockey League (SHL) for the 2001-02 campaign. During the 2003-04 season, he joined back Mora IK and helped them move up to the SHL. After playing for Mora in the 2004-05 SHL campaign, he moved on to fellow SHL side Djurgårdens IF and joined Modo Hockey in 2006. During the 2007-08 season, he again returned to Mora.

Masuhr signed his first contract outside of Sweden prior to the 2009-10 season, when joining KalPa of the Finnish top-flight Liiga. He spent five years with the club and then headed to another Liiga outfit, Oulun Kärpät. Following the 2015-16 season, he left Kärpät and signed with Severstal Cherepovets of the Kontinental Hockey League (KHL).

References

External links 

1983 births
Living people
Swedish ice hockey defencemen
Brynäs IF players
Djurgårdens IF Hockey players
KalPa players
Modo Hockey players
Mora IK players
Oulun Kärpät players
Severstal Cherepovets players
Tierps HK players
People from Gävle
Sportspeople from Gävleborg County